Ice Palace of Sports "Meteor" is a multifunctional facility located in city of Dnipro, Ukraine. Built in 1980, it is one of major ice hockey venues in the country with seating capacity of 6,000. The arena is part of the Sports Complex Meteor.

History
The venue was originally designated for ice rink sports (i.e. figure skating, ice hockey) and has two ice rinks, yet later it was transformed into multifunctional facility providing training site for basketball, martial arts, badminton and other sports. In 2013 it was closed for reconstruction for the 2015 EuroBasket, but the construction was later suspended.

It is used by HC Dniprovski Vovky and sometimes by a basketball team BC Dnipro.

The size of a rink is 61x30. The training rink is the same size with a seating capacity of 300 and located behind the arena.

See also
Sports Complex Meteor

References

External links

 Ice Palace of Sports "Meteor"

Indoor arenas in Ukraine
Basketball venues in Ukraine
Ice hockey venues in Ukraine
Indoor arenas built in the Soviet Union
Sport in Dnipro
Buildings and structures in Dnipro
Sports venues completed in 1980
1980 establishments in Ukraine